In anatomy, internal rotation (also known as medial rotation) is an anatomical term referring to rotation towards the center of the body.

Muscles
The muscles of internal rotation include:

 of arm/humerus at shoulder
 Anterior part of the deltoid muscle
 Subscapularis
 Teres major
 Latissimus dorsi
 Pectoralis major
 of thigh/femur at hip
 Tensor fasciae latae
 Gluteus minimus
 Anterior fibers of Gluteus medius
 Adductor longus and Adductor brevis
 of leg at knee
 Popliteus
 Semimembranosus
 Semitendinosus
 Sartorius
 of eyeball (motion is also called "intorsion" or incyclotorsion)
 Superior rectus muscle
 Superior oblique muscle

See also
List of external rotators of the human body

References

External links

Anatomical terms of motion